Sergey Sergeyevich Litvinov (born 27 January 1986) is a hammer thrower. He was stripped of the bronze medal of the 2014 European Championship for doping. He currently competes for Russia, having previously represented Germany and Belarus.

Career
Litvinov was coached by his father – two time world champion, Olympic champion and former world record holder Sergey Litvinov. He had no notable performances as a junior and was 12th in the IAAF world junior rankings in 2005 with a personal best of 72.14 m (6 kg hammer). The same year he threw 73.98 m with the 7.26 kg hammer, which placed him 57th on the senior world rankings. He finished ninth at the 2004 World Junior Championships in Athletics and 2005 European Athletics Junior Championships. Aged 21, he attended the 2007 European Athletics U23 Championships where he went in as favorite with a mark of 74.80 m set only a month earlier. He qualified as 4th with 69.04 m, but finished 11th in the final.  He improved in 2009, finishing 5th at the world championships with a throw of 76.58 m. He missed the 2010 European Athletics Championships because of the transfer to the Russian team, and failed to reach the final at the 2011 World Championships, but later won bronze medals at the 2013 Summer Universiade and 2014 European Championships.

In 2022, all his results from 14 July 2012 until 25 February 2016 have been cancelled after he recognised have been doped to AIU.

Competition record

Progression

See also
List of eligibility transfers in athletics
List of hammer throwers

References

1986 births
Living people
Sportspeople from Rostov-on-Don
Belarusian male hammer throwers
Russian male hammer throwers
German male hammer throwers
Universiade medalists in athletics (track and field)
Universiade bronze medalists for Russia
Medalists at the 2013 Summer Universiade
Authorised Neutral Athletes at the World Athletics Championships
World Athletics Championships athletes for Germany
World Athletics Championships athletes for Russia
European Athletics Championships medalists
Russian Athletics Championships winners
German national athletics champions